Craig Doyle (born 17 December 1970, Dublin) is an Irish television and radio presenter. To British viewers he is recognisable as working for the BBC and ITV and more recently BT Sport. Irish viewers also know him as the host of RTÉ One chat show Tonight with Craig Doyle and RTÉ Two's Craig Doyle Live. He is the main anchor on BT Sport Premiership, European Champions Cup rugby coverage and MotoGP motorcycle racing. Craig has also been a presenter on ITV's Rugby World Cup coverage.

Early life

Doyle grew up in the Dublin suburb of Stillorgan. Educated in Blackrock College. He studied sociology and history at Maynooth, followed by the London College of Printing, where he earned a diploma in broadcast journalism.

Broadcasting career
After graduation, Doyle worked on local radio with BBC Radio Suffolk based in Ipswich, before moving on to ITV to present the children's show Disney Club in 1995, having been head hunted following a chance meeting with a producer from the show at a visit to Alton Towers.

Moving to London, he presented Tomorrow's World, Fasten Your Seatbelt and Innovation Nation, and spent six years hosting BBC One's Holiday. He also had a live music show on London's Capital Radio every Saturday 8am11am.

Doyle was a key member of the BBC Sport team from 2004, anchoring international rugby, including the Six Nations Championship, and triathlon. He supports London Irish. In 2004, he formed his own production company Boxer. Its first production was The Craig Doyle Show, an Irish travel/celebrity program running on RTÉ, and Doyle produced and presented Ireland's Richest.

Released early from his BBC contract, Doyle joined ITV Sport in February 2008, replacing Jim Rosenthal by hosting the UEFA Champions League highlights on ITV. He also presents ITV4's coverage of the Isle of Man TT. Doyle left Capital Radio at the end of 2008.

Doyle presented Ireland's Top Earners in 2008, later recalled by John Boland in the Irish Independent as a programme that came about "just when the country was sliding inexorably into economic ruin and in which Doyle swooned over the wealth that had been amassed by Seán Quinn" [since bankrupt].

In April 2010, Doyle returned to Irish TV once again to host his own chat show Tonight with Craig Doyle on RTÉ One. In September 2010 he joined the team on ITV's Lorraine as an investigative reporter. Doyle presented Irish satirical program The Panel up to 2011. After that he became the presenter for a new live chat show called The Social from November 2011, which returned to screens in 2012 as Craig Doyle Live.

He presented Now That's What You Called News for RTÉ over the Christmas at the end of 2011.

Doyle currently works with BT Sport presenting coverage of Rugby Union since mid 2013. Doyle also presented BT Sport's coverage of MotoGP between 2015 and 2018.

Since November 2021, Doyle has been appearing on ITV show This Morning usually presenting the competitions. In May 2022 he appeared twice as a guest presenter on the show alongside Alison Hammond. He presented alongside Josie Gibson, Mollie King & Rochelle Humes during the school summer holidays on This Morning in 2022.

Other activities
Doyle presented the ESAT Young Scientist Exhibition in Dublin, sponsored by BT Ireland in 2005. He is prominent in the UK fronting the adverts of double-glazing company Everest Windows. In Ireland he serves as the face of the UPC cable service adverts. He was a face of Littlewoods Ireland.

Personal life
In December 2001, Doyle married his longtime girlfriend Doon. The couple have four children and live in County Wicklow. They also have a home in Kew, West London. Doyle completed his first triathlon in 2006; a year later he represented Ireland at the World Championships in Hamburg, Germany.
He is a big fan of Manchester United.

References

1970 births
Alumni of St Patrick's College, Maynooth
BBC newsreaders and journalists
BT Sport presenters and reporters
Irish rugby union commentators
Irish sports broadcasters
Irish television talk show hosts
ITV Breakfast presenters and reporters
Living people
Mass media people from Dublin (city)
People educated at Blackrock College
RTÉ television presenters
Television presenters from the Republic of Ireland
The Panel (Irish TV series) presenters